Johor Bahru Inner Ring Road, (JBIRR) or Jalan Lingkaran Dalam, Federal Route 188, is a multi-lane federal ring road highway that circles the Johor Bahru Central District in Johor, Malaysia.  The  highway was the most expensive road infrastructure project per kilometre of its time in the country.

The Kilometre Zero of the Federal Route 188 starts at Jalan Abu Bakar junctions near Dataran Bandaraya.

History
Johor Bahru Inner Ring Road commenced construction in 1996 with the objective of diverting traffic not destined for the centre of the city to bypass it through the ring road that connects all four arterial highways and major roads leading into the area.

The construction was divided into three phases:

Phase 1
From the Tanjung Puteri Customs Complex/Jalan Sultan Ibrahim to Jalan Tebrau (Tebrau Highway), this 500-metre section links the Malaysia-Singapore commercial vehicles customs complex to Tebrau Highway, one of the two major arterial highways into the city.  This 6 to 8 lane section comprised two ground-level traffic-light- controlled intersections with provisions for future tri-level interchange, and a two-level interchange with provision for future tri-level interchange.  This phase was opened to traffic in 1998.

Phase 2
This 600 metre elevated section from Jalan Tebrau (Tebrau Highway) to Jalan Abdul Rahman Andak (named after Abdul Rahman Andak) comprises only one interchange, 25 metres high, roughly equivalent to a four-storey building.  It links Tebrau Highway to Jalan Tun Abdul Razak (Skudai Highway) near Plaza Best World.  The tri-level interchange was the tallest traffic interchange at the time of construction in Malaysia.  This phase was opened to traffic in 1999.

Phase 3
This 3.5 kilometre section runs from Jalan Abdul Rahman Andak to Jalan Tun Dato Ismail near the City Square clock tower, or Dataran Bandaraya Johor Bahru. It comprises four ground level traffic-lights controlled intersections with provisions for future dual or tri-level interchanges.  This phase was opened to traffic after multiple delays in 2001.

Features

At most sections, the Federal Route 188 was built under the JKR R5 road standard, allowing maximum speed limit of up to 90 km/h.

Traffic interchanges at Jalan Sultan Ibrahim and Jalan Lumba Kuda merges to Southern International Gateway known as Sultan Iskandar Building.

A flyover on Tebrau Highway Interchange was constructed during the middle of 2006 and became operational to the public on 15 December 2007.

List of interchanges and junctions

See also
 Transport in Malaysia

References

Ring roads in Malaysia
Expressways and highways in Johor
Malaysian Federal Roads